The Łutownia (Belarusian: Лутоўня), in northeast Poland, is a left-bank tributary of the Narewka River. It was formerly known in Polish as the Łętownia , Lętownia , Łotownia , Łutownica , Latownica , Lutownia , and Szczekotówka  River.

The Łutownia flows through the European region known as the Wysoczyzny Podlasko – Bialoruskie (Podlasie-Belarus Plateau) in Poland's Podlasie Province and Belarus' Hrodna Voblast. The river, from its origin to its mouth, flows through the Białowieża Forest.

Villages:
 Nowosady/Zwodzieckie
 Teremiski

Main tributaries (right bank):
 Dubinka
 Krynica

Further reading 

 P. Bajko, Łutownia, Czasopis, 03/2008, ss. 21–22.

External links 

 
 Encyklopedia Puszczy Białowieskiej 
 Collection of 30 photographs of the river Łutownia 
 E. Pierzgalski, J. Tyszka, A. Stolarek, Zmienność odpływu wody ze zlewni rzeki Łutowni (Puszcza Białowieska) w latach 1966-2000, Leśne Prace Badawcze, 2006, 1:21-36

Białowieża Forest
Rivers of Poland
Rivers of Podlaskie Voivodeship